This article summarizes the outcomes of all matches including FIFA recognised, unofficial and matches played against club teams by the India women's national football team, since they first played in 1975.

Results by years

1980s

1990s

2000s

2010s

2020s

Head-to-head records 
The following table shows India's all-time official international record per opponent. Updated as of 18 February 2023 (vs Nepal)

See also

 India men's national team results

References

External links
 
 Friendly results, RSSSF
 AFC results, RSSSF
 FIFA
 Indian Football

 
Women's national association football team results